Sivaguru S. Sritharan (also known as S. S. Sritharan) is an American aerodynamicist and mathematician.

Sritharan served in civilian universities such as University of Southern California and University of Wyoming as faculty member and head of the department and also in the Department of Defense (U. S. Navy and U. S. Air Force) in various capacities ranging from scientist to leadership roles, and also held visiting positions at several international institutions.

He served as the Vice Chancellor at the Ramaiah University of Applied Sciences in Bengaluru, India.

Education
Sritharan had his high schooling at Jaffna Central College. He then joined at University of Sri Lanka (Peradeniya) and obtained a BSc (Honors) degree in mechanical engineering. He obtained a Master of Science degree in aeronautics and astronautics from University of Washington and a master's degree and Ph.D. in applied mathematics from University of Arizona.

Career
Sritharan served as the first Provost and Vice Chancellor of the Air Force Institute of Technology at Dayton, Ohio and as the Dean of the Graduate School of Engineering and Applied Sciences at the Naval Postgraduate School, Monterey, California.

He was a Professor and Head of the Department of Mathematics at University of Wyoming and Head of the Science and Technology Branch at the Naval Information Warfare Systems Command in San Diego.

Contributions
Sritharan is known for his research contributions in rigorous mathematical theory, optimal control and stochastic analysis of fluid mechanics and magneto-hydrodynamics.

His notable contributions include:

1. Developing dynamic programming method for the equations of fluid dynamics. This subject is closely related to reinforcement learning in the language of machine learning.

2. First complete proof of the Pontryagin’s Maximum Principle for fluid dynamic equations with state constraints, as a joint work with UCLA mathematician Hector. O. Fattorini.

3. Developing robust (H-infinity) control theory for fluid dynamics as a joint work with Romanian mathematician Viorel P. Barbu.

4. First successful rigorous theory establishing a direct stochastic analogy to the famous Jacques-Louis Lions and G. Prodi (1959) on existence and uniqueness theorem for the two dimensional Navier-Stokes equation as a joint work with J. L. Menaldi utilizing a subtle local monotonicity property.

5. Proving Large Deviation Principle for stochastic Navier-Stokes equation as a joint work with P. Sundar to estimate the probability of rare events.

Bibliography

References 

20th-century American mathematicians
21st-century American mathematicians
University of Southern California faculty
Aerodynamicists
Alumni of Jaffna Central College
Alumni of the University of Sri Lanka (Peradeniya)
Control theorists
Living people
Mathematical analysts
Naval Postgraduate School faculty
Sri Lankan emigrants to the United States
Sri Lankan mathematicians
Sri Lankan Tamil academics
United States Air Force civilians
United States Navy civilians
University of Arizona alumni
University of Washington alumni
University of Wyoming faculty
Year of birth missing (living people)